Temple of Zeus may refer to:

Greece
 Temple of Zeus, Olympia
 Temple of Olympian Zeus, Athens
 Sanctuary of Zeus Polieus, Athens

Italy
 Temple of Olympian Zeus, Agrigento
 Temple G, Selinunte

Syria 

 Temple of Zeus Kyrios, Dura-Europos
 Temple of Zeus Megistos, Dura-Europos
 Temple of Zeus Theos, Dura-Europos
 Temple of Zeus Hypsistos, Al-Dumayr

Temples of Zeus